Niptus is a genus of beetle present in the Australian region, the Palearctic (including Europe), the Near East, the Nearctic, and North Africa.

Niptus as it is currently described is polyphyletic and researchers have suggested splitting it into two or more genera.

Species include:
Niptus abditus  
Niptus absconditus
Niptus abstrusus
Niptus arcanus  
Niptus giulianii   
Niptus hololeucus – golden spider beetle
Niptus neotomae   
Niptus sleeperi   
Niptus ventriculus

References

External links
Niptus. Fauna Europaea.

Ptinidae
Taxa named by Anatole Auguste Boieldieu